Dominique Blanchar (born Dominique Marie Thérèse Blanchard; 2 June 1927 – 19 November 2018) was a stage, television, and film actress from France. She won two Molière Awards in her career.

Personal life
Dominique Blanchar was born in Paris, the daughter of actors Pierre Blanchar and Marthe Vinot.

Blanchar was married to the Belgian actor Jean Servais, until his death in 1976.

She died on 19 November 2018 at the age of 91.

Career
Blanchar acted in both French and English language films.

Selected filmography

Awards
Blanchar won the Molière Award for Best Supporting Actress twice for her roles in Tout comme il faut (As Better, Better Than Before) in 1997 and Les Femmes Savantes (The Learned Ladies) in 2000.

References

External links
 

1927 births
2018 deaths
French stage actresses
French television actresses
French film actresses
20th-century French actresses
Actresses from Paris